Pomasia salutaris is a moth in the family Geometridae. It is found on Sumatra, Peninsular Malaysia and Borneo. The habitat consists of the upper montane zone up to altitudes of 2,110 meters.

References

Moths described in 1929
Eupitheciini